Horror Fire is the fourth studio album by the Detroit-based heavy metal band Halloween. It was released on June 6, 2006.

Background 
Horror Fire was produced by new drummer Rob Brug. The album marks the return of original bassist George Neal. It is also notable as Halloween's first recording with Brug.

Track listing 
 I Am 02:11 
 Wake Up Screaming 05:41 
 Halloween Night 03:32
 The Crush 03:36  
 Exist 05:33  
 Candles 04:13
 The Seer 03:57 
 The End and the Beginning 01:52  
 Nobody's Home 05:08
 Rage 02:29
 Ways of Man 03:59 
 Head Against a Wall 02:39 
 Coming to Life 03:21
 Sin 00:46 
 Go to Hell (Alice Cooper cover) 04:28  
 Fire Still Burns 03:50  
 The Battle 04:04
 Fighting Words 05:02  
 H.F.B.D.T.Y. 01:45

Total playing time 01:08:06

Personnel 
Brian Thomas - vocals
Donny Allen - guitar
George Neal - bass guitar, keyboards
Rob Brug - drums

References

External links
 Official Halloween website

Halloween (band) albums
2006 albums